South Carolina Highway 20 (SC 20) is a primary state highway in the U.S. state of South Carolina.  The highway connects the cities of Abbeville, Belton, Williamston and Greenville. The  highway is signed as a west-east highway though it physically runs south-to-north.

Route description

History
Established in 1922 as an original state highway, it traversed from the Georgia state line to SC 8 (Guess Street/Green Avenue) in Greenville; connecting McCormick, Abbeville, Due West, Honea Path, Belton, and Williamston.

In 1935, SC 20 was truncated at U.S. Route 29 (US 29, Anderson Highway) in Williamston; its old alignment becoming US 29.  In 1936, all of SC 20 was fully paved.  Around 1937, SC 20 was truncated to its current western terminus in Abbeville, its alignment to the state line replaced by SC 28.  In 1956, SC 20 was rerouted between Due West and Belton, replacing SC 257 and some of SC 284; its old alignment, through Honea Path, was replaced by SC 184 and US 178.  Also same year, SC 20 was extended back along its old alignment north to a rerouted US 29, just south of Greenville.  In 1962, SC 20 was extended into downtown Greenville, along Grove Avenue, ending at US 25 (Augusta Road), replacing US 29 Business (US 29 Bus.).  In 2000, SC 20 was extended to its current northern terminus at Falls Park Drive (formerly Camperdown Way) just shy of US 123, replacing part of US 25 Bus.

Major intersections

Special routes

Abbeville truck route

South Carolina Highway 20 Truck (SC 20 Truck) is a  truck route that has approximately half its path within the city limits of Abbeville. It has concurrencies with SC 71 Truck and SC 28.

It begins at an intersection with the southern terminus of SC 203 Truck (South Main Street) in the south-central part of Abbeville, which is in the southeastern part of Abbeville County. This is also the southern terminus of SC 71 Truck. SC 20 Truck and SC 71 Truck begin concurrent with SC 72. The three highways travel to the west-southwest. Immediately, they curve to the southwest and travel under a railroad bridge that carries some railroad tracks of CSX. They cross over Blue Hill Creek and curve to the south-southwest. They pass the Abbeville Area Medical Center and curve back to the southwest, before leaving the city limits of Abbeville. They pass Piedmont Technical College's Abbeville County Campus before intersecting SC 28. Here, the truck routes turn right, off of SC 72 and onto SC 28.

The three highways travel to the northwest and then pass Westwood Elementary School. They travel through rural areas of the county, passing a United States Department of Agriculture Service Center, the Pete Smith Sports Complex, and the Abbeville County Industrial Park. They cross over the aforementioned CSX rail line for a second time. They have an intersection with the eastern terminus of Old Calhoun Falls Road and the western terminus of Haigler Street, the former of which leads to the Abbeville County Law Enforcement Center, the Sheriff's and magistrates's offices, and detention center. They curve to the north-northeast and then intersect SC 71, where SC 71 Truck ends. SC 20 Truck and SC 28 curve to the northeast and intersect the northern terminus of SC 28 Conn. (North Main Street) and the western terminus of SC 20 Conn. (Hill Road). Here, SC 20 Truck ends, and SC 28 turns left, to the north-northwest.

Abbeville connector

South Carolina Highway 20 Connector (SC 20 Conn.) is a  connector route, partially in the northwestern part of Abbeville. It connects SC 28 and SC 28 Conn. with SC 20. The highway is unsigned for its entire length.

Craytonville connector

South Carolina Highway 20 Connector (SC 20 Conn) is a  connector route and is also known as Clinkscales Road. It connects SC 20 with SC 252 in Craytonville as the SC 20 mainline crosses over SC 252 on an overpass without a direct interchange. The connector route is signed.

See also

References

External links

 
 SC 20 at Virginia Highways' South Carolina Highways Annex

020
Transportation in Abbeville County, South Carolina
Transportation in Anderson County, South Carolina
Transportation in Greenville County, South Carolina